The 1976 MLB Expansion Draft was held November 5, 1976. This expansion draft was conducted by Major League Baseball to stock the major league rosters of the Toronto Blue Jays and the Seattle Mariners, new major league expansion franchises established via the 1977 Major League Baseball expansion that were set to start play in the  season.

Background
Seattle was promised a franchise by Commissioner Bowie Kuhn. During the summer of 1975, there was speculation that the Minnesota Twins, Chicago White Sox, or San Francisco Giants could move to Seattle. When none of these plans proved successful, the American League added a team in Seattle.  With thirteen teams in a league creating a scheduling nightmare, the league awarded a franchise to Toronto over Washington, D.C. in March 1976.

Players were selected only from American League teams, in keeping with the practices of the A.L.'s expansion of 1961, the National League's expansion of 1962, and the expansion of both leagues in 1969. Beginning with the next expansion in 1993, the new teams would select players from teams in both the American and National Leagues.

Danny Kaye, part-owner of the Mariners, announced the club's first selection.

Draft results

References

External links

Expansion draft
 
Major League Baseball expansion drafts
Toronto Blue Jays
Major League Baseball expansion draft
Major League Baseball expansion draft